Cnemaspis nimbus is a species of diurnal, rock-dwelling, insectivorous gecko endemic to India.

References

 Cnemaspis nimbus

nimbus
Reptiles of India
Reptiles described in 2021